The 1946 Jordanian  League (known as The Jordanian  League,  was the 3rd season of Jordan League. Jordan Club won the first and only Jordanian league title in its history.

Overview
Jordan Club won the championship, with player Mike Dickin, formerly playing for the British Mandate of Palestine.

References
RSSSF

External links
 Jordan Football Association website

Jordanian Pro League seasons
Jordan
Jordan
1946 in Jordan